Athena is a clipper-bowed three-masted gaff-rigged schooner built by Royal Huisman in 2004 for Internet entrepreneur James H. Clark. Clark purchased a 47.4 meter sloop, Hyperion, from Royal Huisman in 1998. As Hyperion was nearing completion, Clark began to consider the possibilities of a larger yacht, which could include a theater, library, more guest space and a more capable galley, taking inspiration from the 1920s Krupp built motor yacht "Talitha".

The yacht was re-fitted in 2008. It can support 12 guests and 22 crew, and is built under Lloyds Register classification.

Athena is the winner of the Show Boats International Award for Best Sailing Yacht over 40 Meters for 2004.

A book titled “Athena – A Classic Schooner For Modern Times” (photography by Louie Psihoyos, writer Jack Somer) describes the history, the construction and the life of this vessel.

In July 2012 the Athena was listed for sale with an asking price of US$95 million, and reduced to $75 million in June 2014. In summer 2014 Athena was listed as available for charter in the South Pacific,  priced at approximately €260,000 per week. As of May 2019 the asking price was listed as $45 million (USD).

Similar sailing super yachts of this period include Eos, The Maltese Falcon, and the Black Pearl (yacht).

Specifications 
Length overall - 
Length of deck - 
Length waterline - 60.52 m / 198.56 ft
Beam - 12.2 m / 40.03 ft
Gross tonnage - 1103 t
Displacement - 1126 t
Sail area - 2623 meters squared

See also
 List of large sailing yachts
 Luxury yachts
 Mirabella V

References

External links 

 Athena's entry at Royal Huisman's yacht portfolio
 Yacht: ATHENA - One of the world’s largest and most luxurious three masted schooners, Wayback Machine archive.org

Individual sailing yachts
Three-masted ships
2004 ships